Dotto may refer to:

People

 Dave Del Dotto, a former real estate investor from Modesto, California
 Francesca Dotto (born 1993), an Italian basketball player
 Jean Dotto (1928–2000), first French racing cyclist to win the Vuelta a España
 Luca Dotto (born 1990), an Italian swimmer
 Piermassimiliano Dotto (1970–2012), an Italian rugby union player.
 Saint Dotto, an early Scottish saint

Other

 Dotto, a 1958 American television game show
 Dotto train, a genericized trademark for a trackless train
 Dotto! Koni-chan, a Japanese anime television series